Joeri Adams (born 15 October 1989, in Turnhout) is a Belgian former cyclist.

Major results

Cyclo-cross

2006–2007
 1st  UCI Junior World Championships
 1st Overall UCI Junior World Cup
1st Hofstade
1st Nommay
 Junior Superprestige
1st Asper-Gavere
1st Diegem
1st Vorselaar
 2nd  UEC European Junior Championships
2010–2011
 1st  National Under-23 Championships
 Under-23 DVV Trophy
1st Oudenaarde
2nd Namur
2nd GP Sven Nys
 3rd UEC European Under-23 Championships
 3rd Cauberg Under-23
 5th Overall UCI Under-23 World Cup
2011–2012
 1st GP de la Commune de Contern
2012–2013
 3rd Grand Prix Möbel Alvisse
2014–2015
 1st Grand Prix Möbel Alvisse
2015–2016
 1st  National Amateur Championships
 1st Grand Prix Möbel Alvisse
 1st Cyclo-cross du Mingant
2016–2017
 2nd Grand Prix Möbel Alvisse
 3rd Balan Ardennes
2017–2018
 2nd Grand Prix Möbel Alvisse

Road
2007
 3rd Overall Liège–La Gleize
1st Stage 3

References

External links

1989 births
Living people
Belgian male cyclists
Cyclo-cross cyclists
Sportspeople from Turnhout
Cyclists from Antwerp Province
21st-century Belgian people